HM Prison The Verne is a Category C men's prison, located within the historic Verne Citadel, on the Isle of Portland in Dorset, England. Operated by His Majesty's Prison Service, HMP The Verne was established in 1949 and occupies the southern part of the citadel. After a brief spell as an Immigration Removal Centre in 2014–2017, HMP The Verne re-opened in 2018.

History
HMP The Verne opened in 1949 within the Verne Citadel, which had been designed by Captain W Crossman of the Royal Engineers and built between 1857-81 to defend Portland Harbour. The new prison received its first inmates on 1 February 1949 with the arrival of an advance party of 20 prisoners. Since becoming established the interior of the prison has been substantially rebuilt by prison labour, and the modern prison, a Category C prison for adult males, gained a considerable training programme for its prisoners who were serving either medium and long term sentences, including life sentences.

On 4 September 2013, the Ministry of Justice announced the decision to convert the prison into an immigration removal centre for 600 detainees awaiting deportation. The prison closed in November 2013, with all prisoners being transferred to other suitable prisons, and work to change the function of the prison began immediately. The prison was officially closed in January 2014 by The Closure of Prisons Order 2014. The planned re-role came as part of a wider programme to modernise the prison estate, and the nearby HM Prison Dorchester closed soon after, in December 2013.

With a set opening date in February 2014, it was later announced in March 2014 that the immigration removal centre plans were officially put on hold until September. However, the Prison Service announced that the empty prison will still begin to take on immigration detainees that month, and will still remain known as HMP The Verne. It began holding detainees from 24 March 2014. IRC The Verne reverted to a prison in 2018. The prison is currently used to house sex offenders.

Inspection reports
The Verne was an open-style prison with walls but work has been undertaken in recent years to strengthen the perimeter. It has been praised as an effective jail but various aspects of its work have come in for criticism.

In November 2005, an inspection report from Her Majesty's Chief Inspector of Prisons criticised The Verne for weaknesses in its anti-bullying and suicide prevention policies. The report stated that safety at the prison had "deteriorated significantly" since its last inspection, and that the needs of foreign national prisoners were not being met. However the report said that the prison had made progress in improving its training provision for inmates, and work to prepare prisoners for release had also improved.

During 2008, the prison was criticised to such an extent for not meeting the needs of inmates that Chief Inspector of Prisons Anne Owers believed the best option would be to turn it into a centre exclusively for foreign prisoners. However, in recent years the prison had been praised as an effective prison which needed to develop better employment and resettlement opportunities. The inspectors found that there were low levels of violence, good staff-prisoner relationships, and that the Jailhouse Café, a public cafe offering work experience to prisoners, was a successful social enterprise.

Notable inmates
Disgraced former glam rock star Gary Glitter, who was sentenced to 16 years in prison for a series of sexual offences, was incarcerated at The Verne until his release on licence in February 2023.
Gary Glitter is now back as in inmate in HMP The Verne after violating his license conditions in March 2023.

References

External links
 
 Ministry of Justice pages on The Verne
 Historic pictures of the Verne Citadel and Prison

1949 establishments in England
Prisons in Dorset
Category C prisons in England
Isle of Portland
Men's prisons
Immigration to the United Kingdom
Immigration detention centres and prisons in the United Kingdom